The FIFA All-Time Team is a fictive all-time association football team published by FIFA in 1994. It is an eleven-member side divided as one goalkeeper, four defenders, three midfielders, and three forwards.



See also
FIFA 100
World Team of the 20th Century

References

All-Time Team
World Cup All-Time Team
Lists of association football players